This article is a list of seasons completed by the Utah Jazz of the National Basketball Association (NBA). The Jazz joined the NBA as the New Orleans Jazz, an expansion team that began play in the 1974–75 season. The Jazz relocated from New Orleans to Salt Lake City, Utah for the 1979–80 season. As of the 2019–20 season, the Utah Jazz are the last franchise to not record a 60-loss season.

Seasons

Notes:

A: In this season, each division winner was automatically seeded no worse than 4th  place. Jazz was the Northwest Division winner (51-31), but had a worse record than the Spurs (58-24) who was seeded 3rd and the Jazz was seeded 4th. In the first round, the 5th seed Rockets (52-30) had a better record than the 4th seed Jazz, so the Rockets was awarded home-court advantage even with a lower seed.

B: In this season, division winner can automatically award the top-4 place. Jazz was the Northwest division winner(54-28), below 3rd place team Spurs(56-26), so Jazz was the worst division winner so as in Western Conference 4th place. While Rockets was 55-27, tie with Suns 55-27(neither of two teams are division winner), so though Jazz awarded 4th place, in first round faced with Rockets(Rockets higher than Suns due to higher records in versus with rest of Western Conference teams) with no home court advantage.

Footnotes

 
seasons